TRIUM Global Executive MBA program is an alliance between NYU Stern School of Business, London School of Economics and Political Science (LSE), and HEC School of Management, Paris. TRIUM is ranked at #2 in the world in the 2018 Financial Times EMBA rankings  and #1 in the 2014 edition.

Overview
Launched in 2001, the TRIUM program is designed to meet the business-learning needs of today's entrepreneurial and globally minded senior-level executives.  TRIUM draws on the specific strengths of each of the three alliance universities to deliver a tailor-made international curriculum that combines rigorous global business curriculum with a unique socio-economic and socio-political context.

Academics
The TRIUM program takes place over 18-months, including 10 weeks out of the office.  Modules take place for two weeks each in London, New York City, Paris, and one week each in three emerging markets.

Students receive an MBA issued jointly by the three universities.

Students also have access to resources at all three schools and are members of each school's alumni networks.

Students
The student profile of the recent 2016 class is made up of 65 global executives, whose average age is 40 and who have 10 to 15 years of work experience.  The students represent more than 30 nationalities, and work in a broad range of industries.

Professors
Professors who teach and have taught in the TRIUM program are from the three alliance schools.  They include:

Edward Altman 
Vincent Bastien
Marc Bertoneche
Michael Cox
Nicholas Crafts
Frédéric Dalsace
Aswath Damodaran
Howard Davies
Ken Froewiss 
Ari Ginsberg
Dan Gode
Sonia Marciano
Elizabeth Morrison
Gary P. Sampson
Zur Shapira
Emma Soane
Richard Sylla
Ingo Walter
Ngaire Woods
Larry Zicklin

References

External links
TRIUM Global EMBA Program - Official Site
Financial Times Rankings
LSE TRIUM site
Wall Street Journal Article, "An Executive M.B.A. with a Global Flavor"
Financial Times Article, "The Rankings: Best Salaries Are in Americas"
"Financial Rewards That Set Courses Apart from the Crowd"
Financial Times Article, "The Rankings: Evolution of Species Sees Joint Degree on the Rise"
Stern Global Programs

London School of Economics
Business qualifications